The canton of Nive-Adour is an administrative division of the Pyrénées-Atlantiques department, southwestern France. It was created at the French canton reorganisation which came into effect in March 2015. Its seat is in Mouguerre.

It consists of the following communes:
 
Bardos
Briscous
Guiche
Lahonce
Mouguerre
Saint-Pierre-d'Irube
Sames
Urcuit
Urt
Villefranque

References

Cantons of Pyrénées-Atlantiques